Matsouki is an Aromanian village and a former community in the Ioannina regional unit, Epirus, Greece. Since the 2011 local government reform it is part of the municipality North Tzoumerka, of which it is a municipal unit. The municipal unit has an area of 35.360 km2. Population 455 (2011).

References

Populated places in Ioannina (regional unit)